Capoeta trutta,  the longspine scraper,  is a species cyprinid fish from the Middle East. It is known from inland waters in Iran, Iraq, Syria Armenia and Turkey, and is often quite abundant.

It spawns in running waters, but inhabits in other times also many other habitats including reservoirs and marshes. Most commonly it is found in slowly running lowland rivers.

Capoeta trutta is commonly used as a food fish. It may grow up to 48 cm length.

References 

Trutta
Fish described in 1843